Kofi Yeboah (born 14 May 1995) is a Ghanaian professional footballer who plays as a midfielder.

Club career
Yeboah played for Wa All Stars in the Ghana Premier League. In September 2017, he joined Lebanese Premier League side Tadamon Sour on a one-year deal, ahead of the 2017–18 season. After his contract had expired, in October 2020, Yeboah moved to newly-promoted Kategoria Superiore side Apolonia Fier in Albania, on a short-term contract with an option to extend at the end of the season.

International career
Yeboah represented Ghana internationally at under-20 level, and competed at the 2015 FIFA U-20 World Cup.

References

External links
 
 
 
 

1995 births
Living people
Ghanaian footballers
Association football midfielders
Legon Cities FC players
Tadamon Sour SC players
FK Apolonia Fier players
Ghana Premier League players
Lebanese Premier League players
Kategoria Superiore players
Kategoria e Parë players
Ghana youth international footballers
Ghanaian expatriate footballers
Ghanaian expatriate sportspeople in Lebanon
Ghanaian expatriate sportspeople in Albania
Expatriate footballers in Lebanon
Expatriate footballers in Albania